The 1969 VFL Golden Fleece Night Premiership was the Victorian Football League end of season cup competition played in September of the 1969 VFL Premiership Season. Run as a knock-out tournament, it was contested by the eight VFL teams that failed to make the 1969 VFL finals series. It was the 14th VFL Night Series competition. Games were played at the Lake Oval, Albert Park, then the home ground of South Melbourne, as it was the only ground equipped to host night games. Hawthorn won its second night series cup in a row, defeating Melbourne in the final by 5 points.

Games

Round 1

|- bgcolor="#CCCCFF"
| Winning team
| Winning team score
| Losing team
| Losing team score
| Ground
| Crowd
| Date
|- bgcolor="#FFFFFF"
| 
| 13.13 (91)
| 
| 12.9 (81)
| Lake Oval
| 13,917
| Thursday, 4 September
|- bgcolor="#FFFFFF"
| 
| 11.16 (82)
| 
| 8.21 (69)
| Lake Oval
| 9,050
| Tuesday, 9 September
|- bgcolor="#FFFFFF"
| 
| 15.11 (101)
| 
| 14.11 (95)
| Lake Oval
| 5,432
| Friday, 12 September
|- bgcolor="#FFFFFF"
| 
| 16.21 (117)
| 
| 11.21 (87)
| Lake Oval
| 10,287
| Tuesday, 16 September

Semi-finals

|- bgcolor="#CCCCFF"
| Winning team
| Winning team score
| Losing team
| Losing team score
| Ground
| Crowd
| Date
|- bgcolor="#FFFFFF"
| 
| 7.14 (56)
| 
| 6.15 (51)
| Lake Oval
| 12,516
| Thursday, 18 September
|- bgcolor="#FFFFFF"
| 
| 18.12 (120)
| 
| 18.10 (118)
| Lake Oval
| 7,353
| Wednesday, 24 September

Final

|- bgcolor="#CCCCFF"
| Winning team
| Winning team score
| Losing team
| Losing team score
| Ground
| Crowd
| Date
|- bgcolor="#FFFFFF"
| 
| 10.17 (77)
| 
| 9.18 (72)
| Lake Oval
| 21,067
| Monday, 29 September

See also

List of Australian Football League night premiers
1969 VFL season

External links
 1969 VFL Night Premiership - detailed review including quarter-by-quarter scores, best players and goalkickers for each match

Australian Football League pre-season competition